The scarlet pimpernel (Anagallis arvensis) is a very common small annual plant with red or orange flowers.

Scarlet Pimpernel may also refer to:

Literature and theatre
 The Scarlet Pimpernel, a 1905 novel by Baroness Orczy based on a 1903 play by the same author, as well as the title character from said play and book
 The Scarlet Pimpernel (musical), a 1997 Broadway adaptation, or the song of the same name from the musical

Film, television and radio
 The Scarlet Pimpernel, a 1917 American film adaptation starring Dustin Farnum
 The Scarlet Pimpernel (1934), a British film adaptation starring Leslie Howard
 The Return of the Scarlet Pimpernel (1937), a British film adaptation starring Barry K. Barnes 
 The Scarlet Pimpernel (1952–53), a British radio series starring Marius Goring
 The Adventures of the Scarlet Pimpernel (1955–56), a British television series starring Marius Goring
 "The Scarlet Pimpernel" (1960), an episode of DuPont Show of the Month starring Michael Rennie
 The Scarlet Pimpernel (1982), a British television adaptation starring Anthony Andrews
 The Scarlet Pimpernel (1999–2000), a British television series starring Richard E. Grant
 The Scarlet Pimpernel (2017), a two-part BBC Radio 4 adaptation starring James Purefoy

Music
 "Scarlet Pimpernel", an instrumental track on the Black Sabbath album The Eternal Idol

See also
 The Scarlet Pumpernickel, a 1949 Looney Tunes animated short film spoofing the Orczy works
 Don't Lose Your Head , A 1967 British comedy film, which parodies the work.
 Hugh O'Flaherty, Catholic priest and senior official of the Roman Curia, nicknamed "The Scarlet Pimpernel of the Vatican"
 Pimpinela Escarlata, a Mexican professional wrestler